In the terminology of the United States Diplomatic Service, a hardship post is a diplomatic post where living conditions are difficult due to climate, crime, health care, pollution or other factors.
Employees assigned to such posts receive a hardship differential of between 10 and 35 percent of their salary. A hardship post with security issues, for example in a war zone, may also be a designated hardship post with employees eligible for additional danger pay.

References

External links
 Hardship Posts for Beginners, Associates of the American Foreign Service Worldwide

Government occupations